Dziennik Związkowy (Alliance Daily) or Polish Daily News, is the largest and the oldest Polish language newspaper in the United States. Established in 1908 in Chicago as an organ of the Polish National Alliance from whose headquarters at Polonia Triangle in Chicago's Polish Downtown the paper was originally printed. Considered the leading voice of Chicago's Polonia, Dziennik Związkowy has been published without break from its founding in 1908 until the present day, making it the oldest Polish language newspaper in the world published without interruption. Jan Krawiec was editor-in-chief from the early 1960s until 1985.

Its weekend edition of about one hundred pages has a circulation of about 30,000. The paper is published and sold throughout the Chicago metropolitan area, and—as a subscription—elsewhere in the United States.  Copies are also sent for distribution to Poland, to research libraries, and to Poland's parliament, the Sejm.

Dziennik Związkowy is published 5 times every week covering diverse topics from local news to sports, culture as well as extensive coverage of Poland and Polish-related topics in the English Language press. A slimmer daily edition is released Monday through Thursday while an extensive "Weekend Edition" is published every Friday with a wide array of special sections and inserts along with an additional magazine titled "Kalejdoskop". Additionally, a section aimed at Chicago's large Góral community appears, titled "The Highlander Chronicle" or Kronika podhalańska in Polish is published every Wednesday in the Dziennik Związkowy.

The newspaper is a subsidiary of the Polish National Alliance, a Polish-American fraternal organization. The current president of the PNA is Frank Spula. Dziennik Związkowy is published by Alliance Printers & Publishers Inc.

Magdalena Pantelis is the general manager of Polish Daily News, and Alliance Printers & Publishers. 
The present editor in chief is Małgorzata Błaszczuk, and deputy editor is Elizabeth Glinka. Other editorial staff members are: Andrew Z. Kazimierczak, Alicia Otap, Krystyna Cygielska, Ewa Malcher.

External links
 Webpage of the paper
 Dziennik Związkowy classifieds
 Digital version of issues from 1908 to 1917 at the Center for Research Libraries

Newspapers published in Chicago
Polish-language newspapers published in the United States
Polish-American culture in Chicago
Non-English-language newspapers published in Illinois